Epimecis matronaria is a species of geometrid moth in the family Geometridae. It is found in Central America and North America.

The MONA or Hodges number for Epimecis matronaria is 6601.

References

Further reading

 

Boarmiini
Articles created by Qbugbot
Moths described in 1858